Cathetocephalidae is a family of flatworms belonging to the order Tetraphyllidea.

Genera:
 Cathetocephalus Dailey & Overstreet, 1973
 Sanguilevator Caira, Mega & Ruhnke, 2005

References

Platyhelminthes